Samuel Joseph Greller (May 18, 1907 – March 17, 1972) was an American water polo player who competed in the 1928 Summer Olympics. He played all three matches. In 1976, he was inducted into the USA Water Polo Hall of Fame.

References

External links
 
 Sam Greller's profile at jewsinssports.org

1907 births
1972 deaths
American male water polo players
Water polo players at the 1928 Summer Olympics
Olympic water polo players of the United States
American water polo coaches